Kunkus (Ancash Quechua kunkush Puya raimondii, hispanicized spelling Cuncus) is a mountain in the Paryaqaqa mountain range in the Andes of Peru which reaches an altitude of approximately . It is located in the Junín Region, Yauli Province, Yauli District. Kunkus lies northwest of Putka and Yantayuq.

References

Mountains of Peru
Mountains of Junín Region